Asdrúbal Colmenárez (born 1936, in Venezuela) is a contemporary artist. He was first invited to represent Venezuela at the Paris Art Biennale in 1969. In 1970 he won a fellowship from the Guggenheim Foundation in New York City. Besides being an artist, Colmenárez was professor of Contemporary Art at the Université de Vincennes, Paris beginning in 1973. Colmenárez represented his country at the Havana Art Biennale in 1983 and 1985.

For more than 40 years, Colmenárez has based his investigations around the "event". An art piece acquires exponential magnitude when the spectator has been stimulated and provided with certain tools to create and manipulate. These works are mostly "Psycho-magnetic Tactiles" (started in 1970) and Psychorelatives" (begun in 1972).

Colmenárez works and lives in Paris and Tenerife.

References
Museo de arte Contemporaneo de Caracas Sofia Imber, book 1998, legal deposition If25219987002034
John Simon Guggenheim Memorial Foundation 
 Banco Central de Venezuela, Collection of Art List

Links
 Mike-Art-Kunst Gallery
Video production on Vimeo by editionsMAK.com

1936 births
Living people
Venezuelan artists